The 1996–97 Arkansas Razorbacks men's basketball team represented the University of Arkansas in the 1996–97 college basketball season. The head coach was Nolan Richardson, serving for his 12th year. The team played its home games in Bud Walton Arena in Fayetteville, Arkansas.

Arkansas
Arkansas Razorbacks men's basketball seasons
Arkansas
Arkansas Razorbacks men's b
Arkansas Razorbacks men's b